Greenfly is the artist name of Lawrence Green, a drum and bass music producer and DJ from Reading, England. His music style leans towards the more soul/funk influenced styles of drum'n'bass. He is currently signed to FF Recordings and has been releasing music since 2001. Greenfly also co-runs Subfactory, a free weekly drum'n'bass event in Reading, Berkshire, England.

Biography 
Greenfly first started making music at the age of eight when he taught himself to play the piano. Years later after playing various instruments (including guitar, drums, keyboards to name a couple) in many bands, he got into drum and bass around 1994 after hearing one of the Essential Mixes on BBC Radio 1. From then he got into music production and a couple of years later released his self-entitled debut album on Millennium Records, London. Following on from the global success of this he continued to make music and in 2001 his track "G-Funk" was signed by Good Looking Records. The track was an instant success and was voted 3rd best dnb tune of 2003 by a Mixmag poll as well as featuring on LTJ Bukem's Progressions Sessions CDs. Since then Greenfly has released several other tracks on Good Looking Records and over 30 singles on other labels such as V recordings, Camino Blue, FF Recordings, Zen, Red Mist and Strictly-Digital. Greenfly is still producing drum'n'bass for his own label, FF Recordings, as well as music for adverts, animations and websites. In 2009, he released his debut four track EP on FF entitled Playing Tunes.

Discography 
Greenfly - Millennium Records (CD Album) 2001 (track listing:)
Slipstream
Ironside
Shark Attack
S-Axis
Make Me Feel
Sonar
Buzzfrog
Cloud 10
Another Reality
G-Funk - Good Looking Records (12") 2002
Mierda Hedionda - Cookin Records (CD) 2002
Blue Corvette - Good Looking Records (12") 2003
Electrofusion - Looking Good Records (12" ) 2003
Gulfstream - Good Looking Records (12") 2004
Biorhythms - Good Looking Records (12") 2004
Future Colonies - Strictly Digital (MP3) 2005
Hyperdermic - Strictly Digital (MP3) 2005
Music Has A Voice - Strictly Digital (MP3) 2005
Sandstorm - Strictly Digital (MP3) 2005
Sunshine - Zen (MP3) 2005
Sixteen - Red Mist Recordings (CD) 2006
World of Love - FF Recordings (12") 2006
Shining Light- FF Recordings (12") 2006
Suelo Mas Alto (AMC Remix) - FF Recordings (12") 2006
Neural Net - Camino Blue Recordings (12") 2006
Control - Camino Blue Recordings (MP3) 2006
Outer Rim - FF Recordings (12") 2006
Stand Alone (feat Stealth) - FF Recordings (12") 2006
One Love (feat Jewels) - FF Recordings (12") 2007
Outer Rim (Kubiks Remix) - FF Recordings (12") 2008
Hypnosis (feat Neil Mac) – FF Recordings (mp3) 2009
Be There – FF Recordings (mp3) 2009
Yeah Man – FF Recordings (mp3) 2009
Playing Tunes (feat Neil Mac & Bird) – FF Recordings (mp3) 2009

Remixes
Groove Diggerz - Good Times (Breakin Even 12") 2009

References

External links 
 Greenfly Myspace

British record producers
English drum and bass musicians
Living people
Year of birth missing (living people)